Cord or CORD may refer to:

Common meanings 

 Thin rope
 Power cord
 Cord (unit) used for measuring wood
 Umbilical cord

Cord or CORD may also refer to:

Places 
 Cord, Arkansas

People 
 Alex Cord (1933–2021), American actor and writer
 Chris Cord (born 1940), American racing driver
 Errett Lobban Cord (1894–1974) American industrialist
 Ronnie Cord (1943–1986), Brazilian singer
 Cord McCoy (born 1980), American bull and saddle bronc rider
 Cord Meyer (1920–2001), American CIA official
 Cord Parks (born 1986), American professional football player
 Cord Phelps (born 1987), American professional baseball player
 Cord Pool, guitarist for American red dirt metal band Texas Hippie Coalition
 Cord Widderich (died 1447), German pirate

Arts, entertainment, and media 
 Cord (band),  a British rock group
 Cord (film), a 2000 film starring Daryl Hannah and Jennifer Tilly
 Cordero "Cord" Buchanon, a fictional character in One Life to Live
 The Cord Weekly, a student newspaper at Wilfrid Laurier University

Biology 
 Chronic obstructive respiratory disease or CORD, an alternate name for chronic obstructive pulmonary disease
 Mycelial cord, a structure, used by fungi to transfer nutrients over larger distances
 Spinal cord
 Umbilical cord, a tube that connects a developing embryo or fetus to its placenta

Organizations 

Organizations with the acronym CORD include:
 Canadian Organization for Rare Disorders, a non-profit health organization
 Christian Outreach for Relief & Development, a humanitarian organization, based in Leamington Spa, England
 Coalition for Reforms and Democracy, a Kenyan political coalition
 Council of Emergency Medicine Residency Directors, a scientific organization

Other uses
 Cord (sewing), a decorative trim made of multiple strands of yarn twisted together
 Cord, a short form for the textile type corduroy
 Cord Automobile, a former American car marque

See also
 Chord (disambiguation)
 Coord (short for coordinate)
 Cordage (disambiguation)
 Cordé, a fictional character in the Star Wars universe
 CORDS (disambiguation)
 Rope (disambiguation)
 String (disambiguation)